Wallace Kirkman Harrison (September 28, 1895 – December 2, 1981) was an American architect. Harrison started his professional career with the firm of Corbett, Harrison & MacMurray, participating in the construction of Rockefeller Center. He is best known for executing large public projects in New York City and upstate, many of them a result of his long and fruitful personal relationship with Nelson Rockefeller, for whom he served as an adviser.

Career
Harrison's work in the mid-twentieth century comprised large, modernist public projects and office buildings.  As a young man, Harrison took classes in engineering at Worcester Polytechnic Institute and in architecture at the Boston Architectural Club; he studied at the École des Beaux-Arts in the early 1920s and won the Rotch Taveling Scholarship in 1922.  He worked for McKim, Mead & White and Bertram Grovesnor Goodhue from 1916 to 1923, and later formed a series of architectural partnerships.  Harrison participated with the architectural teams involved in the construction of Rockefeller Center in New York City, completed in 1939.  His brother-in-law was married to John D Rockefeller'Jr's daughter, Abigail and Harrison serve as a designer and architectural adviser for Nelson Rockefeller, notably in the years when Rockefeller was governor of New York.

In 1941 Harrison joined with Max Abramowitz to form the firm of Harrison & Abramowitz.  In partnership with Abramovitz, Harrison designed scores of university and corporate buildings, including the Time & Life (1959) and Socony-Mobil (1956), both designated New York City landmarks.

Among Harrison's most noted projects are the Metropolitan Opera House at the Lincoln Center for the Performing Arts and the Empire State Plaza in Albany; he also served as Director of Planning on the United Nations complex, which was built on slaughter-house property contributed by the Rockefeller family (the Rockefellers owned the Tudor City Apartments across First Avenue). Harrision also developed the design for the Pershing Memorial in Washington, D.C. (today referred to as Pershing Park, and home to the National World War I Memorial. In addition to his architectural work, Harrison served as master planner and supervising architect for a number of important Long Island-based projects, including the World's Fairs of 1939 and 1964 in Flushing, Queens, and LaGuardia and Idlewild (now John F. Kennedy) airports.

Harrison's major projects are marked by straightforward planning and sensible functionalism, although his residential side-projects show more experimental flair.  In 1931, Harrison established an  summer retreat in West Hills, New York, which was a very early example and workshop for the International Style in the United States, and a social and intellectual center of architecture, art, and politics.  The home includes a  circular living room that is rumored to have been the prototype for the Rainbow Room in Rockefeller Center.  Two other circular rooms complete the center of Harrison's design. Frequent visitors and guests included Nelson Rockefeller, Robert Moses, Marc Chagall, Le Corbusier, Alexander Calder and Fernand Léger. Harrison's expansive country property also exhibited his relationships with contemporary architects. For example, shortly after purchasing the property in 1931, Harrison and his wife bought the Aluminaire House, an iconic, compact, ready-to-assemble steel-and-aluminum structure designed by Swiss architect Albert Frey and then editor of Architectural Record, A. Lawrence Kocher.

Harrison collected works by Calder and Léger and commissioned new ones for buildings that he designed, including his Long Island country house in West Hills, New York; a pavilion at the 1939 New York World's Fair; parts of Rockefeller Center; and the United Nations headquarters. Léger waited out part of World War II by painting a mural at the bottom of Harrison's swimming pool. Léger also created a large mural for the home's circular living room and sculpted an abstract form to serve as a skylight. Calder's first show is said to have taken place at the home. In 1965, Harrison was appointed to a commission to choose modern art works for the Governor Nelson A. Rockefeller Empire State Plaza Art Collection in Albany, NY.

Between 1941 and 1943, Harrison designed and built the Clinton Hill Coops, a 12-building coop complex split between two "campuses" along Clinton Ave. in Brooklyn, New York, to house the Brooklyn Navy Yards workers.

Harrison's architectural drawings and archives are held by the Drawings and Archives Department of Avery Architectural and Fine Arts Library at Columbia University.

Harrison was a member of the U.S. Commission of Fine Arts from 1955 to 1959. In 1967, Harrison received the AIA Gold Medal. In 1938, he was elected into the National Academy of Design as an Associate member, and became a full Academician in 1948.

Personal life
Harrison married Ellen Hunt Milton (1903-1995) in 1926. They had a daughter, Sarah, and lived in Manhattan and Seal Harbor, Maine.

Major projects

 Rockefeller Center, part of the Associated Architects, 1931-1971
 The Rockefeller Apartments (with J. André Fouilhoux), commissioned by Nelson Rockefeller, facing the Museum of Modern Art Sculpture Garden, 1936
 Trylon and Perisphere for the 1939 New York World's Fair
 10 Rockefeller Plaza (formerly the Eastern Airlines Building), part of Rockefeller Center, 1939
 The Clinton Hill Co-ops, Brooklyn, New York, 1941–43
 The Corning Museum of Glass, Corning, New York, 1951
 Sophronia Brooks Hall Auditorium, Oberlin, Ohio, 1953
 The First Presbyterian Church ("The Fish Church"), Stamford, Connecticut, 1958
 1271 Avenue of the Americas (formerly the Time-Life Building) at Rockefeller Center, New York City, 1959
 The Nelson A. Rockefeller Empire State Plaza, Albany, New York, his last major project, 1959–1976
  Hopkins Center for the Arts, Dartmouth College, whose details foreshadow the Metropolitan Opera House, 1962
 Lead architect for the headquarters of the United Nations, coordinating the work of an international cadre of designers, including Sven Markelius, Le Corbusier, and Oscar Niemeyer, 1952
 Erieview Tower, Cleveland, Ohio, 1963
 The New York Hall of Science at the 1964 New York World's Fair, New York City, 1964
 Air traffic control tower, LaGuardia Airport (1964) (demolished 2011)
 Hilles Library, Harvard University, 1965
 Metropolitan Opera House and the master plan for Lincoln Center for the Performing Arts, coordinating the work of Pietro Belluschi, Gordon Bunshaft, Philip Johnson, and Eero Saarinen, 1961-1966 (The Opera House opened in 1966)
 master plan for Battery Park City, New York City, 1966
 1221 Avenue of the Americas (formerly the McGraw-Hill Building) at Rockefeller Center, 1969
 1251 Avenue of the Americas (formerly the Exxon Building) at Rockefeller Center, 1971
 The National City Tower, Louisville, Kentucky, 1972
Jasna Polana Mansion, Princeton, New Jersey, about 1975

See also

 Nelson Rockefeller
 Rockefeller Center
 Lincoln Center

References

Further reading
 Newhouse, Victoria. Wallace K. Harrison, Architect. New York: Rizzoli, 1989.
 Reich, Cary. The Life of Nelson A. Rockefeller: Worlds to Conquer 1908–1958. New York: Doubleday, 1996.
 Sudjic, Deyan. The Edifice Complex: How the Rich and Powerful—and Their Architects—Shape the World. New York: Penguin, 2005.
 Okrent, Daniel. Great Fortune: The Epic of Rockefeller Center. Viking Penguin, 2003.

External links
 Wallace K. Harrison architectural drawings and papers, 1913-1986 (bulk 1930-1980)Held by the Department of Drawings & Archives, Avery Architectural & Fine Arts Library, Columbia University

1895 births
1981 deaths
20th-century American architects
20th-century American businesspeople
Architects from New York City
Architecture firms based in New York City
American ecclesiastical architects
Rockefeller Center
Architects from Worcester, Massachusetts
People from West Hills, New York
Modernist architects from the United States
Fellows of the American Institute of Architects
New York Hall of Science
Recipients of the AIA Gold Medal
Members of the American Academy of Arts and Letters